Co-Ro Food is a manufacturer of fruit-based uncarbonated soft drinks based in Frederikssund, Denmark. The company was founded by the brothers Flemming and Jep Petersen in 1942.  It has production in 11 countries and had revenues of DKK 1.65 billion in 2012.

Products
 Sunquick
 Suntop
 Suncola
 Sun Lolly
 Sunjoy

References

External links
 Official website
 Source

Drink companies of Denmark
Food and drink companies based in Copenhagen
Companies based in Frederikssund Municipality
Danish companies established in 1942
Food and drink companies established in 1942